This is a list of music-related events in 1807.

Events
Muzio Clementi begins negotiating for British publication rights to the music of Ludwig van Beethoven

Classical Music
Ludwig van Beethoven 
Piano Concerto No.4, Op.58 (Premiered in March in Vienna)
Piano Concerto in D major, Op. 61a
Coriolan, Op.62
Symphony No.5, Op. 67 (composition begins)
Mass in C, Op. 86
6 Ecossaises, WoO 83
Johann Baptist Cramer 
Piano Concerto No.5, Op. 48
Studio per il pianoforte, Op. 50, Book 2
Anton Eberl – Piano Quintet in G minor, Op. 41
Joseph Eybler – Omnes de Saba venient
Johann Nepomuk Hummel – Hélène and Paris (ballet)
Franz Krommer – Harmonie in F major, Op.57
Wenzel Thomas Matiegka – Serenade for Flute, Viola and Guitar, Op. 26
Antoine Reicha 
Grand Quintet, Op. 106
Trio for 3 Cellos
Ferdinand Ries –  Cello Sonata in A major, Op. 21
Louis Spohr 
Violin Concerto No.5, Op. 17
Potpourri No.2, Op. 22
Fantasia for Harp, Op. 35
Variations sur 'Je suis encore dans mon printemps', Op. 36
Daniel Steibelt – Harp Concerto
Carl Maria Von Weber – Symphony No. 1

Published popular music
Thomas Moore – Irish melodies (music by John Andrew Stevenson)

Opera
Etienne-Nicolas Méhul – Joseph  (Premiered December 15 in Paris)
 Gaspare Spontini – La Vestale (The Vestal Virgin) (first performed in Paris, Libretto by Etienne Jouy.)

Births
January 6 – Ludwig Erk, music teacher and composer (died 1883)
January 11 – Charles Jefferys, music publisher and lyricist (died 1865)
January 23 – Joseph Casavant, manufacturer of pipe organs (d. 1874)
February 14 – Ernest Legouvé, librettist and dramatist (died 1903)
February 15 – Ignacy Feliks Dobrzyński, Polish symphonist (d. 1867)
February 27 – Henry Wadsworth Longfellow, lyricist and poet (died 1882)
March 7 – , German composer (d. 1878)
March 30 – Henrik Rung, composer (d. 1871)
June 6 – Adrien-François Servais, cellist (d. 1866)
September 11 – Ignaz Lachner (d. 1895)
October 15 – Jan van Boom, composer (died 1872)
October 21 – Hilarión Eslava, composer (died 1878)
October 22 – Nikolay Bakhmetev, composer (died 1891)
date unknown 
James P. Clarke, composer (d. 1877) 
Henriette von Schorn, lyricist and poet (died 1869)

Deaths
February 25 – Jeanne-Marie Marsan, actress and singer (b. 1746)
March 1 – Niel Gow, fiddler (b. 1727)
March 11 – Anton Eberl, pianist, composer and music teacher (b. 1765)
March 27 – Michele Mortellari, composer (born c. 1750)
June 15 – Charles Bernardy, dancer and choreographer (b. 1724)
June 16 – John Skinner, songwriter (b. 1721)
December 21 – John Newton, author of the hymn, Amazing Grace (b. 1725)

References 

 
19th century in music
Music by year